Darko Kralj (born 6 June 1971) is a Croatian Paralympic athlete competing mainly in shot put events. He lost his left leg in a missile attack in 1991.

At the 2008 Summer Paralympics in Beijing, he won a gold medal in the men's F42 shot put event improving his world record with 14.43 metres.  At the 2011 IPC Athletics World Championships held in Christchurch, Kralj won a silver medal.

The King, a Croatian-language film about Kralj's life directed by Dejan Aćimović, was released in 2012.

References

External links
 
 The King (2012), a documentary about Kralj directed Dejan Acimovic

1971 births
Living people
People from Garešnica
Paralympic athletes of Croatia
Athletes (track and field) at the 2008 Summer Paralympics
Athletes (track and field) at the 2012 Summer Paralympics
Paralympic gold medalists for Croatia
Paralympic silver medalists for Croatia
Croatian amputees
World record holders in Paralympic athletics
Medalists at the 2008 Summer Paralympics
Medalists at the 2012 Summer Paralympics
Sport in Bjelovar-Bilogora County
Paralympic medalists in athletics (track and field)
Croatian male shot putters
21st-century Croatian people